Schistocerca cancellata is a species of locust in the subfamily Cyrtacanthacridinae. It is the major swarming species in subtropical South America. This species shows typical locust phase polymorphism. Solitarious nymphs are green, but gregarious ones are yellow with a black pattern. There are morphological differences between solitarious and gregarious adults. For many years the two phases were believed to be different species and the gregarious form was mistakenly identified as S. paranensis.
The solitary phase is found in South America between 18°S and 35°S. Plagues originate in a desert and semi-desert zona permanente in NW Argentina, SE Bolivia and W Paraguay, when good rains allow successful breeding, followed by gregarisation. Swarms of gregarious adults may then migrate into crop growing regions.

Economic importance
Schistocerca cancellata is polyphagous, damaging a wide range of crops and forage plants. It is probably the most economically damaging of all the locust species. It was estimated that in 1933, locusts destroyed 2 million tons of cereals and other annual crops. High levels of damage have also been recorded in Uruguay and Brazil.

References 

 

Cyrtacanthacridinae
Orthoptera of South America
Insects described in 1838